The Easton flag is an early American flag used in modern times to represent Easton, Pennsylvania.

Flag
The flag is designed differently from more common flags of the United States in that it has 13 (8-pointed) stars in a blue field, with 13 stripes in the canton. The flag's design is consistent with the 1777 Flag Act, which does not specify the location of the stars and stripes: "That the flag of the thirteen United States be thirteen stripes, alternate red and white; that the union be thirteen stars, white in a blue field, representing a new constellation."

History
According to local legend, the flag was hoisted when the Declaration of Independence was publicly read in Easton, Pennsylvania by Robert Levers on July 8, 1776, two days before a copy of the Declaration reached New York City.

The flag was used as a company flag under Captain Abraham Horn in the War of 1812, and some suspect that the design may only date from this era. This is considered unlikely by some, as flags would have had 15 stars and stripes in 1814. The flag was given in 1821 to the Easton library for safe-keeping when the company returned. The Easton Area Public Library still holds the flag.

Notes

References

Sources

External links
 Flag history from Easton Area Public Library

Easton, Pennsylvania
Easton, Pennsylvania
Flags of cities in Pennsylvania
Flags introduced in 1821
Flags introduced in 1776